James Yorke may refer to:

 James A. Yorke (born 1941), mathematician
 James Yorke (bishop) (1730–1808), British clergyman
 James Yorke (figure skater), American ice dancer
 James Yorke (writer), English heraldic writer

See also
James Yorke Scarlett (1799–1871), British general in the Crimea War
James York (disambiguation)